Selenodes is a genus of moths belonging to the subfamily Tortricinae of the family Tortricidae.

Species
Selenodes concretanus (Wocke, 1862)
Selenodes karelicus (Tengstrom, 1875)

See also
List of Tortricidae genera

References

External links
tortricidae.com

Tortricidae genera
Olethreutinae
Taxa named by Achille Guenée